Conner Rousseau (born 13 November 1992) is a Belgian politician who is the chairman of the social-democratic Flemish Vooruit party (formerly known as the sp.a). He became its chairman in November 2019 at the age of 26.

Biography
Rousseau was born in Sint-Niklaas and is the son of former sp.a politician and university professor Christel Geerts who was the mayor of Sint-Niklaas and John Rousseau, a former basketball player. He studied law at Ghent University and then worked as an advisor to Flemish minister Freya Van den Bossche and then sp.a chairman John Crombez.

During the 2019 Belgian regional elections, Rousseau was elected to the Flemish Parliament on the East Flanders list. After his election, he announced his intention to run for leadership of the sp.a and succeeded Crombez in this role. In 2020, he announced his intention to change the name of the party from Socialistische Partij Anders (Socialist Party Differently) to Vooruit meaning "Forward." The motion was approved by party members and came into effect in 2021.

Rousseau caused some controversy when he was videoed dancing at a wedding party in July 2020, in Fréjus, France without wearing a mask during the COVID-19 lockdown.

References

1992 births
Living people
Flemish politicians
Socialistische Partij Anders politicians
Members of the Flemish Parliament
Ghent University alumni
21st-century Belgian politicians